The sixth season of the police procedural drama NCIS premiered on September 23, 2008. The new NCIS director Leon Vance (played by Rocky Carroll) became a regular cast character and Agent Gibbs's new team members were introduced: NCIS Agents Michelle Lee from Legal, Daniel Keating from Cybercrime, and Special Agent Brent Langer from the FBI. Langer is killed in the first episode of the season. After the end of the second episode, McGee, Ziva, and Tony return to the team, while Lee and Keating are transferred back to Legal and Cybercrime, respectively. 

The two-part episode "Legend" introduced the team who would later go on to appear in the spin-off TV series NCIS: Los Angeles.

Cast

Main 
 Mark Harmon as Leroy Jethro Gibbs, NCIS Supervisory Special Agent (SSA) of the Major Case Response Team (MCRT) assigned to Washington's Navy Yard
 Michael Weatherly as Anthony DiNozzo, NCIS Senior Special Agent, second in command of MCRT
 Cote de Pablo as Ziva David, Mossad Liaison Officer to NCIS
 Pauley Perrette as Abby Sciuto, Forensic Specialist for NCIS
 Sean Murray as Timothy McGee, NCIS Junior Special Agent
 Rocky Carroll as Leon Vance, new NCIS Director 
 David McCallum as Dr. Donald "Ducky" Mallard, Chief Medical Examiner for NCIS

Also starring 
 Brian Dietzen as Jimmy Palmer, Assistant Medical Examiner for NCIS

Recurring 
 Joe Spano as Tobias Fornell, FBI Senior Special Agent
 Muse Watson as Mike Franks, retired Senior Special Agent for NCIS and Gibbs' former boss
 Liza Lapira as Michelle Lee, NCIS Special Agent
 David Dayan Fisher as Trent Kort, CIA Agent
 Jonathan LaPaglia as Brent Langer, former member of Gibbs' team, former FBI Special Agent, and re-recruited to NCIS
 Aviva Baumann as young Shannon Gibbs, Gibbs' deceased wife
 Michael Nouri as Eli David, Ziva's father and Mossad Director
 Ralph Waite as Jackson Gibbs, Gibbs' father
 Paula Newsome as Jackie Vance, Leon Vance's wife
 Khamani Griffin as Jared Vance, Leon Vance's son
 China Anne McClain as Kayla Vance, Leon Vance's daughter
 Kent Shocknek as Guy Ross, ZNN news anchor
 Jude Ciccolella as Phillip Davenport, Secretary of the Navy 
 Merik Tadros as Michael Rivkin, Mossad Agent 
 Arnold Vosloo as Amit Hadar, Mossad Agent
 Omid Abtahi as Saleem Ulman, NCIS target
 Peter Jason as Robert King, Biological Weapons Specialist

Guest appearances 
 Chris O'Donnell as G. Callen, NCIS Senior Special Agent attached to the Office of Special Projects in Los Angeles
 LL Cool J as Sam Hanna, NCIS Special Agent at the O.S.P.
 Louise Lombard as Lara Macy, NCIS Supervisory Special Agent at the O.S.P.
 Daniela Ruah as Kensi Blye, NCIS Special Agent at the O.S.P.
 Peter Cambor as Nate Getz, NCIS Operational Psychologist for the O.S.P.
 Barrett Foa as Eric Beale, NCIS Technical Analyst for the O.S.P.

Episodes

DVD special features
Cast and Crew Commentaries on Selected Episodes
"Bodies of Work" – Actor Brian Dietzen Gives a Tour of WM Creations, The Company that Created the "Bodies" used in N.C.I.S.
"Fear: A DVD Exclusive" – An Acoustic Version of Pauley Perrette's Song "Fear"
"Starting with a Bang" – A Look at the Season's Opening Arc
"Horsin' Around" – Featurette Based on "South by Southwest" Episode
"Season Six: Cruising Along" – Cast and Crew Reflect on Some of the Major Events of the Season
"Six Degrees of Conversation" – The Cast Talks about Season 6

References

General references 
 
 
 
 

2008 American television seasons
2009 American television seasons
NCIS 06